Charles Mortimer (1885–1964) was a British actor.
Son of Charles Neil Mortimer - actor.
Husband of Greta Wood - actress.

Filmography
 Watch Beverly (1932) (film debut)
 You Made Me Love You (1933)
 Sometimes Good (1934)
 The Return of Bulldog Drummond (1934)
 Evergreen (1934)
 The Triumph of Sherlock Holmes (1935)
 Royal Cavalcade (1935)
 The Mystery of the Mary Celeste (1935)
 Things Are Looking Up (1935)
 The Price of a Song (1935)
 The Small Man (1936)
 Birds of a Feather (1936)
 Living Dangerously (1936)
 Someone at the Door (1936)
 Aren't Men Beasts! (1937)
 Dead Men Are Dangerous (1939) 
 Poison Pen (1939) 
 The Ghost of St. Michael's (1941)
 Theatre Royal (1943)
 The Life and Death of Colonel Blimp (1943)
 Dial 999 (1955)
 The Counterfeit Plan (1957) (final film)

References

External links

1885 births
1964 deaths
British male film actors
20th-century British male actors